Henry Thynne may refer to:

Henry Thynne (1675–1708), Member of Parliament for Weymouth and Melcombe Regis, and Tamworth
Henry Thynne (librarian) (died 1705), librarian to Charles II, treasury commissioner (1684) and grandfather of Thomas Thynne, 2nd Viscount Weymouth
Henry Carteret, 1st Baron Carteret (1735–1826), originally Henry Thynne, British politician
Henry Thynne, 3rd Marquess of Bath (1797–1837), MP for Weobly
Lord Henry Thynne (1832–1904), British politician, son of the above
Henry Thynne, 6th Marquess of Bath (1905–1992), British politician, great-grandson of the third Marquess
Sir Henry Thynne, 1st Baronet (1615–1680) of the Thynne Baronets